The 1922–23 Panhellenic Championship was the first football event that was named Panhellenic Championship and was organized by the Greece Football Clubs Association. They were preceded by the Athens-Piraeus Football Clubs Association Championship and the Macedonia Football Clubs Association Championship under the auspices of Young Men's Christian Association of Thessaloniki. Difficulties, the cost of travel and other problems, led to the decision to judge the title over a single match between the two champions of each association, in which Piraikos Syndesmos prevailed over Aris by 3–1 or 4–1 (according to two different sources).

Athens-Piraeus Football Clubs Association

Group A

Group B

Athens-Piraeus Final Round

Macedonia Football Clubs Association

Final

The match took place on 12 August 1923* at Iraklis' Gymnasium.

|+Summary

|}

Piraikos Syndesmos won the championship.

* 25 August according to the current Gregorian calendar.

**According to some sources the final score was 4–1.

References
Rsssf 1922–23 championship

 

Panhellenic Championship seasons
1922 in association football
1923 in association football
1922–23 in Greek football